India–Sri Lanka relations (Indiyava-Shri Lanka Sabandatha) also referred to Indian-Sri Lankan relations or Indo-Sri Lanka relations, are the bilateral relations between India and Sri Lanka. Only 4% of Sri Lankans have a negative view on India, the lowest of all the countries surveyed by the Ipsos GlobalScan. The two countries are also close on economic terms with India being the island's largest trading partner and an agreement to establish a proto single market also under discussion at an advanced stage. There are deep racial and cultural links between the two countries. India and Sri Lanka share a maritime border. India is the only neighbour of Sri Lanka, separated by the Palk Strait; both nations occupy a strategic position in South Asia and have sought to build a common security umbrella in the Indian Ocean. Both India and Sri Lanka are republics within the Commonwealth of Nations.

They have been however tested by the Sri Lankan Civil War and by the controversy of Indian intervention during the war. In recent years Sri Lanka has moved closer to China, especially in terms of naval agreements.  India has signed a nuclear energy deal to improve relations. India made a nuclear energy pact with Sri Lanka in 2015.

History 
Sri Lanka was established as a country after European colonialism, prior to which the nation functioned as an independent Kingdom under a line of singular monarchs or multiple kingdoms. The Kingdom had continuous wars with occupying South Indian Kingdoms.

Early history 

According to traditional Sri Lankan chronicles (such as the Dipavamsa) Buddhism was introduced into Sri Lanka in the 4th century BCE by Venerable Mahinda, the son of Indian Emperor Ashoka, during the reign of Sri Lanka's King Devanampiya Tissa. During this time, a sapling of the Bodhi Tree was brought to Sri Lanka and the first monasteries and Buddhist monuments were established. Among these, the Isurumuni-vihaara and the Vessagiri-vihaara remain important centers of worship. He is also credited with the construction of the Pathamaka-cetiya, the Jambukola-vihaara and the Hatthaalhaka-vihaara, and the refectory. The Pali Canon, having previously been preserved as an oral tradition, was first committed to writing in Sri Lanka around 30 BCE.

Sri Lanka has the longest continuous history of Buddhism of any Buddhist nation, with the Sangha having existed in a largely unbroken lineage since its introduction in the 4th century.  During periods of decline, the Sri Lankan monastic lineage was revived through contact with Myanmar and Thailand.  Periods of Mahayana influence, as well as official neglect under colonial rule, created great challenges for Theravada Buddhist institutions in Sri Lanka, but repeated revivals and resurgences – most recently in the 19th century CE – have kept the Theravada tradition alive for over 2,600 years.

Tamils in Sri Lanka, had established Hinduism and Tamil language links with South India. Nainativu Nagapooshani Amman Temple considered as one Shakthi Peethams. Koneswaram and Ketheeswaram are considered as only Paadal Petra Sthalangal in Sri Lanka.

Indian intervention in the Sri Lankan civil war 

In the 1970s–1980s, private entities and elements in the Research and Analysis Wing and the state government of Tamil Nadu were believed to be encouraging the funding and training for the Liberation Tigers of Tamil Eelam, a separatist insurgent force. In 1987, faced with growing anger amongst its own Tamils, and a flood of refugees, India intervened directly in the conflict for the first time after the Sri Lankan government attempted to regain control of the northern Jaffna region by means of an economic blockade and military assaults, India supplied food and medicine by air and sea. After subsequent negotiations, India and Sri Lanka entered into an agreement/13th amendment. The peace accord assigned a certain degree of regional autonomy in the Tamil areas with Eelam People's Revolutionary Liberation Front (EPRLF) controlling the regional council and called for the Tamil militant groups to lay down their arms. Further India was to send a peacekeeping force, named the IPKF to Sri Lanka to enforce the disarmament and to watch over the regional council.

According to Rejaul Karim Laskar, a scholar of Indian foreign policy, Indian intervention in Sri Lankan civil war became inevitable as that civil war threatened India's “unity, national interest and territorial integrity.” According to Laskar, this threat came in two ways: On the one hand external powers could take advantage of the situation to establish their base in Sri Lanka thus posing a threat to India, on the other the LTTE's dream of a sovereign Tamil Eelam comprising all the Tamil inhibited areas (of Sri Lanka and India) posed a threat to India's territorial integrity.

Even though the accord was signed between the governments of Sri Lanka and India, with the Tamil Tigers and other Tamil militant groups not having a role in the signing of the accord, most Tamil militant groups accepted this agreement, the LTTE rejected the accord because they opposed the candidate, who belonged to another militant group named Eelam Peoples Revolutionary Liberation Front (EPRLF), for chief administrative officer of the merged Northern and Eastern provinces. Instead, the LTTE named three other candidates for the position. The candidates proposed by the LTTE were rejected by India. The LTTE subsequently refused to hand over their weapons to the IPKF.

The result was that the LTTE now found itself engaged in military conflict with the Indian Army, and launched their first attack on an Indian army rations truck on October 8, killing five Indian para-commandos who were on board by strapping burning tires around their necks. The government of India then decided that the IPKF should disarm the LTTE by force, and the Indian Army launched a number of assaults on the LTTE, including a month-long campaign dubbed Operation Pawan to wrest control of the Jaffna peninsula from the LTTE. When the IPKF engaged the LTTE, the then president of Sri Lanka, Ranasinghe Premadasa, began supporting LTTE and funded LTTE with arms. During the warfare with the LTTE, IPKF was also alleged to have made human rights violation against the civilians. Notably, IPKF was alleged to have perpetrated the Jaffna teaching hospital massacre which was the killing of over 70 civilians including patients, doctors and nurses. The ruthlessness of this campaign, and the Indian army's subsequent anti-LTTE operations made it extremely unpopular amongst many Tamils in Sri Lanka. The conflict between the LTTE and the Indian Army left over 1,115 Indian soldiers dead.

The Indo-Sri Lankan Accord, which had been unpopular amongst Sri Lankans for giving India a major influence, now became a source of nationalist anger and resentment as the IPKF was drawn fully into the conflict. Sri Lankans protested the presence of the IPKF, and the newly elected Sri Lankan president Ranasinghe Premadasa demanded its withdrawal, which was completed by March 1990. on May 21, 1991, Rajiv Gandhi was assassinated and the LTTE was alleged to be the perpetrator. As a result, India declared the LTTE to be a terrorist outfit in 1992. Bilateral relations improved in the 1990s and India supported the peace process but has resisted calls to get involved again. India has also been wary of and criticised the extensive military involvement of Pakistan in the conflict, accusing the latter of supplying lethal weaponry and encouraging Sri Lanka to pursue military action rather than peaceful negotiations to end the civil war.

Culture 
The two countries share near-identical racial and cultural ties.
Sinhalese people who make up 75% of the total population descend in part from Northern Indian Indo-Aryan settlers who migrated the Island from 543BCE to 243BCE. Tamil people (included Indian Tamils and Sri Lankan Moors) who make up 25% of the total population belonging to the Dravidian group that migrated to the island from 300BC.

Economy

Commercial ties 

India and Sri Lanka are member nations of several regional and multilateral organizations such as the South Asian Association for Regional Cooperation (SAARC), South Asia Co-operative Environment Programme, South Asian Economic Union and BIMSTEC, working to enhance cultural and commercial ties. Since a bilateral free trade agreement was signed and came into effect in 2000, Indo-Sri Lankan trade rose 128% by 2004 and quadrupled by 2006, reaching US$2.6 billion. Between 2000 and 2004, India's exports to Sri Lanka in the last four years increased by 113%, from US$618 million to $1,319 million while Sri Lankan exports to India increased by 342%, from $44 million to $194 million. Indian exports account for 14% of Sri Lanka's global imports. India is also the fifth largest export destination for Sri Lankan goods, accounting for 3.6% of its exports. Both nations are also signatories of the South Asia Free Trade Agreement (SAFTA). Negotiations are also underway to expand the free trade agreement to forge stronger commercial relations and increase corporate investment and ventures in various industries. The year 2010 is predicted to be the best year for bilateral trade on record, with Sri Lanka's exports to India increasing by 45% over the first seven months of the year

India's National Thermal Power Corp (NTPC) is also scheduled to build a 500 MW thermal power plant in Sampoor (Sampur). The NTPC claims that this plan will take the Indo-Sri Lankan relationship to a new level.

Fishing disputes 

There have been several alleged incidents of Sri Lankan Navy personnel firing on Indian fishermen fishing in the Palk Strait, where India and Sri Lanka are separated by only . The issue started because of Indian fishermen having used mechanised trawlers, which deprived the Sri Lankan fishermen (including Tamils) of their catch and damaged their fishing boats. The Sri Lankan government wants India to ban use of mechanized trawlers in the Palk Strait region, and negotiations on this subject are undergoing. So far, no concrete agreement has been reached since India favours regulating these trawlers instead of banning them altogether. Another cause of anger amongst the Sri Lankan side is the use of mechanized trawlers, which they view as ecologically damaging. Presently there is no bona fide Indian fisherman in Sri Lankan custody. A Joint Working Group (JWG) has been constituted to deal with the issues related to Indian fishermen straying in Sri Lankan territorial waters, work out modalities for prevention of the use of force against them, the early release of confiscated boats and explore possibilities of working towards bilateral arrangements for licensed fishing. The JWG last met in January 2006.

India officially protested against the Sri Lankan Navy for its alleged involvement in attacks on Indian fishermen on January 12, 2011. After the official protest, another fisherman was killed on 22 January 2011. Over 730 fishermen have been killed in the last 30 years. The apathetic attitude of the Indian government and the national media towards the alleged killing of Tamil Nadu fishermen by the Sri Lankan Navy has been strongly condemned. Several Tamil Nadu politicians like Vaiko and Jayalalitha have condemned the federal government for not doing enough to stop the killing of Indian Tamil fishermen, and for offering training, equipment, and strategic cooperation for the Sri Lankan Navy. In 2010, Naam Thamizhar Katchi Chief coordinator Seeman got arrested under National security act for his reported statement that he would attack the Sri Lankan students if the killing of Tamil fishermen continued by the Sri Lankan navy. Later he got acquitted of the charges and set free by the Madras high court. In November 2014, Sri Lanka ordered capital punishment to Indian fishermen who were allegedly involved in drug supply or other kind of smuggling. Activists from India approached to Sri Lankan government through an appeal, where they stated the need to strengthen south Asian regional cooperation for all such issues. It was appealed that though crime of any kind must get punishment, but capital punishment must be revoked in this case and in general from all over south Asia. Sri Lanka Prime Minister Ranil Winckramsinghe told during an interview to a television channel in March 2015 that 'if Indian fishermen will cross the sea boundary, Sri Lankan navy can shoot them.' This remark sparked controversy over Sri Lanka–India relations. External affairs minister of India raised the issue with meeting her counterpart in Sri Lanka, but the statement of PM of Sri Lanka was condemned by civil rights activists, and open letters were written to PMs of Sri Lanka and India to resolve the dispute and to apologize for statements.

In October 2021, Sri Lankan fishermen from the North and Tamil parties launched a protest on the sea complaining about the inability of Sri Lankan authorities to deal with Indian poachers.

Development co-operation 

India is active in a number of areas of development activity in Sri Lanka. About one-sixth of the total development credit granted by India is made available to Sri Lanka.

In the recent past, three lines of credit were extended to Sri Lanka: US$100 million for capital goods, consumer durables, consultancy services and food items, US$31 million for the supply of 300,000 MT of wheat and US$150 million for purchase of petroleum products. All of the lines of credit have been fully used. Another line of credit of US$100 million is now being made available for rehabilitation of the Colombo-Matara railway.

A number of development projects are implemented under Aid to Sri Lanka funds. In 2006–07, the budget for Aid to Sri Lanka was Rs 28.2 Crs.

A memorandum of understanding on Cooperation in Small Development Projects has been signed. Projects for providing fishing equipment to the fishermen in the East of Sri Lanka and solar energy aided computer education in 25 rural schools in Eastern Sri Lanka are under consideration.

India has supplied medical equipment to hospitals at Hambantota and Point Pedro, supplied 4 state-of-the-art ambulances to the Central Province, implemented a cataract eye surgery programme for 1500 people in the Central Province and implemented a project of renovation of OT at Dickoya hospital and supplying equipment to it.

The projects under consideration are the construction of a 150-bed hospital at Dickoya, upgrading of the hospital at Trincomalee and a US$7.5 million grant for setting up a cancer hospital in Colombo. India also contributes to the Ceylon Workers Education Trust that gives scholarships to the children of estate workers.

A training programme for 465 Sri Lankan Police officers has been commenced in Dec 2005. Another 400 Sri Lankan Police personnel are being trained for the course of Maintenance of Public Order.

Indian governments have also showed interest in collaborating with their Sri Lankan counterparts on building tourism between the two countries based on shared religious heritage. Madhya Pradesh CM Shivraj Chauhan in June 2013 stated he was working with Sri Lankan authorities to build a temple dedicated to the Hindu deity Sita in Nuwara Eliya. In November 2019, Prime Minister Narendra Modi stated that India will invest $400 million in infrastructure projects in Sri Lanka amid improving ties after talks with Sri Lanka's new President Gotabaya Rajapaksa. stated that it will lend Sri Lanka $400 million for infrastructure projects, India-Sri Lanka border crossings

Only land border India and Sri Lanka have is in Talaimannar on a Ram Sethu sand dune.

Shared Tourism 

In the past, ferry services for tourists have been introduced and suspended repeatedly because of their low usage. The low usage of the old ferry services could be due to the high cost of the former services. As of now, the only way for tourists to access India from Sri Lanka is by air. 
In 2019 negotiations about ferry services between Colombo and Tuticorin and between Talaimannar and Rameshwaram began. There is also a proposal to operate a cruise/ferry service between Colombo and Kochi in Kerala. The Indian and Sri Lankan governments are working close together to connect the two neighboring countries better.
The Sri Lankan minister of Tourism Development John Amaratunga indicates that a ferry service will help tourists from both sides to travel at a very low cost.

Security 

India and Sri Lanka signed an agreement allowing for the transfer of criminals serving prison sentences in the other country to be repatriated to serve the balance of their sentences in their home country. Sentenced persons from Kerala and Tamil Nadu have been transferred under the agreement from Sri Lanka to India. There are areas of cooperation where people to people contacts are focused. Sri Lanka and India has friendly relations through people's support also. It was seen that A. T. Ariyaratne in Sri Lanka helped in spreading non-violence and community service activities on Gandhian philosophy.

Alleged RAW interference 
In 2015, the Sri Lankan Government expelled the country's RAW agent for the role played in uniting the opposition for the 2015 presidential election. In October 2018, President Sirisena alleged that Indian RAW was plotting his assassination. He made this comment in the cabinet meeting, after CID of Sri Lanka Police arrested an Indian national in September for the alleged assassination of Sirisena and former Defence Secretary Gotabaya Rajapaksa. After President Sirisena's comment on this, the media reported that the Indian High Commissioner met with the president, and Indian Prime Minister Narendra Modi had a telephone conversation with the president.

China 

In recent years Sri Lanka has moved closer to China, especially in terms of naval agreements.  India and Sri Lanka in February 2015 signed a nuclear energy deal to improve relationships.  Recently elected Indian Prime Minister Narendra Modi in a meeting with recently elected Sri Lankan ex-president Maithripala Sirisena stated that: "India is Sri Lanka's closest neighbour and friend. Our destinies are interlinked."

Grants to Sri Lanka by India and other co-operation—Sri Lanka is one of India's major development partners and this partnership has been an important pillar of bilateral ties between the two countries over the years. With grants alone amounting to around US$570 million, the overall commitment by GOI is to the tune of more than US$3.5 billion. Demand driven and people-centric nature of India's development partnership with Sri Lanka have been the cornerstone of this relationship.

See also 
 Sri Lankans in India
 Indians in Sri Lanka
 List of Indians in Sri Lanka
 Indian Tamils of Sri Lanka
 Deputy High Commission of Sri Lanka, Chennai
 Foreign relations of Sri Lanka
 Foreign relations of India
 India–Sri Lanka maritime boundary agreements
 South Asian Association for Regional Cooperation (SAARC)

References

Further reading
 Malone, David M., C. Raja Mohan, and Srinath Raghavan, eds. The Oxford handbook of Indian foreign policy (2015) excerpt pp 412–423.

External links

 Common gods, shared values thread India, Sri Lanka together
 Sinhala Hindi English Dictionary and Sinhala To Hindi Language Translator
 India-Sri lanka 2015 
 / From Sri Lanka to India within hours by sea

 
Sri Lanka
Bilateral relations of Sri Lanka
India and the Commonwealth of Nations
Sri Lanka and the Commonwealth of Nations